Fred Smith (born 30 August 1941) is a former Australian rules footballer who played with Collingwood in the Victorian Football League (VFL).

References

External links 

1941 births
Living people
Australian rules footballers from Victoria (Australia)
Collingwood Football Club players